Paraleprodera is a genus of longhorn beetles of the subfamily Lamiinae, containing the following species:

 Paraleprodera assamensis Breuning, 1935
 Paraleprodera bigemmata (Thomson, 1865)
 Paraleprodera bisignata (Gahan, 1895)
 Paraleprodera carolina (Fairmaire, 1900)
 Paraleprodera cordifera (Thomson, 1865)
 Paraleprodera corrugata Breuning, 1935
 Paraleprodera crucifera (Fabricius, 1793)
 Paraleprodera diophthalma (Pascoe, 1857)
 Paraleprodera epicedioides (Pascoe, 1866)
 Paraleprodera flavoplagiata Breuning, 1938
 Paraleprodera insidiosa (Pascoe, 1888)
 Paraleprodera itzingeri Breuning, 1935
 Paraleprodera javanica Breuning, 1943
 Paraleprodera malaccensis Breuning, 1936
 Paraleprodera mesophthalma Bi & Lin, 2012
 Paraleprodera stephanus (White, 1858)
 Paraleprodera tonkinensis Breuning, 1954
 Paraleprodera triangularis (Thomson, 1865)
 Paraleprodera vicina Breuning, 1940

References

Lamiini